Humberto Manuel de Jesus Coelho (born 20 April 1950) is a Portuguese retired footballer and manager.

In a career mainly associated with Benfica, the central defender also competed professionally in France and the United States, during a 16-year career. He won more than 60 caps for Portugal, being the player with the most appearances for several years.

Coelho worked as a manager since 1985, also being in charge of several national teams including his own.

Playing career
Born in Cedofeita, Porto, Coelho was regarded as one of the best stoppers in Portuguese football, imposing himself in Lisbon-based S.L. Benfica's first team at the age of 18 – four years later, he had already played in 101 Primeira Liga matches for the club. On 27 October 1968 he made his debut for Portugal, in a 3–0 win over Romania for the 1970 FIFA World Cup qualifying stages; during the next 15 years he would appear in a further 63 internationals, scoring six goals while acting as captain on 30 occasions.

From 1975 and during two seasons, Coelho played abroad with Paris Saint-Germain FC. He continued to display the traditional attacking penchant in spite of his position as he netted six times in his first year, although the side could only finish in 14th position in Ligue 1.

Subsequently, Coelho returned to Benfica, helping to the conquest of a further three leagues and four domestic cups. He last appeared for the national team at the age of 33, during the 0–5 defeat in the Soviet Union for the UEFA Euro 1984 qualifiers – Portugal would qualify for the final stages in France, but he was severely injured during that period and retired shortly after, having appeared for his main club in 496 competitive matches (355 in the league alone) and scoring 76 goals.

|}

Coaching career
More than one decade after starting as a coach, with spells with S.C. Salgueiros and S.C. Braga, both in the top level, Coelho led Portugal to the semi-finals of Euro 2000. However, his contract was not renewed, and late into that same year he was appointed manager of Morocco, being released after the Atlas Lions failed to qualify for the 2002 World Cup.

After a spell with South Korea, which ended after roughly one year after a surprise loss to Vietnam, Coelho joined another one in 2008, Tunisia, after a brief return to club action in Saudi Arabia. On 18 November 2009, he was fired following a 0–1 loss in Mozambique for the 2010 World Cup qualification, which ended the country's streak of three consecutive presences in the tournament.

Subsequently, Coelho acted as a director in the Portuguese Football Federation.

Personal life
Coelho met his future wife, Laurence, shortly after having moved to Paris in 1975. She worked as a freelance reporter for RTL, and the couple became parents to two daughters, born in 1980 and 1986.

Honours

Player

Club
Benfica
Primeira Liga: 1968–69, 1970–71, 1971–72, 1972–73, 1974–75, 1980–81, 1982–83, 1983–84
Taça de Portugal (6)
Supertaça Cândido de Oliveira: 1980

International
Portugal
Brazilian Independence Cup runner-up: 1972

Individual
Portuguese Footballer of the Year: 1974

Manager
South Korea
EAFF E-1 Football Championship: 2003

References

External links

1950 births
Living people
Footballers from Porto
Portuguese footballers
Association football defenders
Primeira Liga players
S.L. Benfica footballers
Ligue 1 players
Paris Saint-Germain F.C. players
North American Soccer League (1968–1984) players
Las Vegas Quicksilver players
Portugal youth international footballers
Portugal under-21 international footballers
Portugal international footballers
Portuguese expatriate footballers
Expatriate footballers in France
Expatriate soccer players in the United States
Portuguese expatriate sportspeople in France
Portuguese expatriate sportspeople in the United States
Portuguese football managers
Primeira Liga managers
S.C. Braga managers
Al Shabab FC (Riyadh) managers
Portugal national football team managers
UEFA Euro 2000 managers
Morocco national football team managers
South Korea national football team managers
Tunisia national football team managers
2002 African Cup of Nations managers
Portuguese expatriate football managers
Expatriate football managers in Morocco
Expatriate football managers in South Korea
Expatriate football managers in Saudi Arabia
Expatriate football managers in Tunisia
Portuguese expatriate sportspeople in Morocco
Portuguese expatriate sportspeople in South Korea
Portuguese expatriate sportspeople in Saudi Arabia
Portuguese expatriate sportspeople in Tunisia